Jamal ( /) is an Arabic masculine given name, meaning "beauty", and a surname. It is used in the Middle East, North Africa, West Africa, East Africa, Central Asia, the Caucasus, the Balkans, and predominantly Muslim countries in South Asia. It is also used amongst African Americans and some Turkic peoples in Russia.

In Egypt, the name is pronounced  and as such is normally transliterated Gamal. Tunisians and Somalis may spell it Jamel or Jamal. Algerians spell it Djamel. Somalis mainly spell this name as Jamaal. In Turkish, the name is transliterated as Cemal, in Albanian as Xhemal (though not to be confused with Shamil), and in Serbian, Croatian, and Bosnian as Džemal or Ćemo.

Notable people with the given name Jamal (and other spelling variants)
 Jamal (unknown), A normal Rich Man In Indonesia
 Jamal Abro (1924–2004), Pakistani Sindhi Writer
 Jamal Adams (born 1995), American football player
 Jamal Agnew (born 1995), American football player
 Jamal Anderson (born 1972), American football player
 Moses Michael Levi Barrow (born Jamal Michael Barrow; 1978), better known by his stage name Shyne, Belizean rapper and politician
 Jammal Brown (born 1981), American football offensive tackle
 Jamal Carter (born 1994), American football player
 Jamal Crawford (born 1980), American basketball player
 Jamal Dajani (born 1957), Palestinian-American journalist, producer and writer
 Jamal Edwards (1990–2022), British entrepreneur
 Jamal El-Haj (born 1960), Swedish politician
 Jamal Fyfield (born 1989), English footballer
 Jamal Greene (fl. 1990s–2020s), American legal scholar and Professor of Law at Columbia Law School
 Jamal Al Hajj (born 1971), Lebanese footballer
 Jamal Hamdan (born 1958), Lebanese actor and voice actor
 Jamal Idris (born 1990), Australian rugby player
 Jamal Khashoggi, a US-Saudi man murdered in the Saudi Embassy in Turkey
 Jamal Khwaja (1926–2020), Indian philosopher
 Jamal Lewis (American football) (born 1979), American football player
 Jamal Lewis (footballer) (born 1998), Northern Irish footballer
 Jammal Lord (born 1981), American football player
 Jamal Malyar, Pakistani politician, leader of the Pashtun Tahafuz Movement
 Jamal Mashburn (born 1972), American basketball player
 Jamal Mayers (born 1974), Canadian ice hockey player
 Jamal Mohamed (born 1984), Kenyan footballer
 Jamal Murray (born 1997), Canadian basketball player
 Jamal Musiala (born 2003), footballer
 Jamal Mustafa, American wrestler (better known by the ring name Mustafa Saed)
 Jamal Nebez (1933–2018), Kurdish linguist and mathematician
 Jamal Peters (born 1996), American football player
 Jamal Phillips (born 1979), American rapper, member of Illegal and Def Squad
 Jamal Robinson (born 1973), American basketball player
 Jamal Robinson (American football) (born 1993), American football player
 Jammal Shahin (born 1988), English footballer
 Jamal Williams (born 1976), American football player
 Jamal Woolard (born 1975), American entertainer
 Jamal Zougam (born 1973), 2004 Madrid train bombings suspect
 Gamal Abdel Nasser (1918–1970), Egyptian revolutionary, one of the two principal leaders of the Egyptian Revolution of 1952
 Jamal, stage name of Eddie Fatu or Umaga (wrestler) (1973–2009), Samoan wrestler

Notable people with the surname Jamal (and other spelling variants)

Surname
 Ahmad Jamal (born 1930),  American jazz pianist and composer
 Ahmed Jamal (born 1988), Pakistani cricketer
 Amir H. Jamal (1922–1995), former Tanzanian Minister of Finance
 Ammar Jemal (born 1987), Tunisian footballer
 Jules Jammal (born 1932-1956), Syrian military officer
 Khan Jamal (1946-2022), American musician
 Maher Jamal, Syrian politician
 Noel Jammal (born 1990), Lebanese race car driver
 Razane Jammal (born 1987), Lebanese actress

Fictional characters
 Jamal Lyon, one of the main protagonists of the Fox show Empire
 Jamal Malik, protagonist in the film Slumdog Millionaire
 Jamal Jenkins, main character in the PBS show Ghostwriter (TV series)
 Jamal Grant, main character in the NBC show City Guys
 Jamal Al-Fayeed, main antagonist of the FX show Tyrant (TV series)
 Jamal Wallace, main character of the film Finding Forrester
 Jamal, a supporting character in the video game Sonic Unleashed
'

See also
 Mumia Abu-Jamal (born Wesley Cook, 1954), American convict
 Jamal ad-Din (disambiguation)
 Jamaal
 Jamahl
 Jamali (given name)
 Djamel

References

External links 
 

Arabic masculine given names